Eduard Stadtler (February 17, 1886 in Hagenau – October 5, 1945 in NKVD special camp Nr. 7) was a German journalist and nationalist politician who formed the Anti-Bolshevist League in 1918. Stadler had begun advocating the creation of a "national socialist" dictatorship in 1918.

Stadtler had been a member of the German National People's Party (DNVP) until 1933 when he defected to the Nazi Party weeks prior to the DNVP being dissolved.

After the Second World War ended, he was arrested by the Soviet NKVD and died in the NKVD special camp Nr. 7.

References

External links
  "NKVD special camp Nr. 7 (museum)" managed by the Foundation of Memorials in Brandenburg

1886 births
1945 deaths
People from Haguenau
People from Alsace-Lorraine
German National People's Party politicians
Nazi Party politicians
German male journalists
German male writers
German military personnel of World War I
People who died in NKVD special camp Nr. 7
20th-century German journalists

Nazis who died in prison custody